This is a list of people who have served as Custos Rotulorum of Berkshire.

Sir William Essex bef. 1544–1548
Robert Keilway 1549–1581
Sir Henry Neville bef. 1584–1593
Sir Edward Norreys 1601–1603
Sir Henry Neville bef. 1605–1615
Sir Francis Moore 1615–1621
Richard Lovelace, 1st Baron Lovelace 1621–1634
William Craven, 1st Earl of Craven 1634–1689
Henry Howard, 7th Duke of Norfolk 1689–1701
For later custodes rotulorum, see Lord Lieutenant of Berkshire.

References
Institute of Historical Research - Custodes Rotulorum 1544-1646
Institute of Historical Research - Custodes Rotulorum 1660-1828

Local government in Berkshire
 Custos
Berkshire